Antonio della Chiesa (1394 – 22 January 1459) was an Italian Roman Catholic Dominican superior and the companion of Bernardino of Siena. He was born in 1394 as the son of the Marquis della Chiesa in San Germano. He was well-educated due to being a noble and demonstrated a keen taste for the religious life and devoted himself to the service of God; he grew up with the hopes of becoming a member of the clergy. His father opposed this desire, which later led to his son breaking off all links to his parents.

Despite the protests of his parents, della Chiesa he became a member of the Order of Preachers in Vercelli at age 20 and soon gained great recognition as an apt preacher and confessor. He accompanied Saint Bernardine of Siena on a range of missions and served in various capacities in the Dominican monasteries. Among those positions was that of the prior; he served at the friaries of Como and Florence as well as in Savona and Bologna. In Como, he reformed the life and morals of the town and was sent to govern other friaries following this success. It was at those friaries that he insisted on a rigorous observance to their rule of life according to Saint Dominic.

Della Chiesa was also one of the leaders opposing the last of the antipopes: Felix V who troubled the Roman Catholic Church from 1440 until 1449. Felix V had a large support network stemming from Switzerland and della Chiesa opposed the work of the antipope. He managed to succeed in winning over a large number of the antipope's adherents to the lawful power of the true pontiff: Pope Eugene IV and later Pope Nicholas V.

While on a trip from Savona to Genoa, pirates captured him, though della Chiesa was released unharmed. He had been apprehended with a fellow friar and the pirates released the pair after being so impressed with the demeanor of the two religious. He was a known miracle worker and was said to be able to read the consciences of men and women alike.

Della Chiesa died in 1459 and was able to predict the date of his death. His relics were translated on 28 July 1810 to his birthplace. Pope Pius VII affirmed his cultus and beatified della Chiesa on 15 May 1819, while setting his liturgical feast for 28 July – the date of the translation of his relics.

Antonio della Chiesa is an ancestor of Giacomo della Chiesa – the future Pope Benedict XV (1854–1922) who reigned during World War I over four centuries after Antonio's own life.

References

Procter, Lives of the Dominican Saints, pp. 210–213. (See further V. Pellazza, Elogio storico del B. Antonio (1863) Taurisano, Catalogus Hagiographicus O.P., p. 40; and L. Ferretti, Vita del B. Antonio (1919))

1394 births
1459 deaths
15th-century venerated Christians
15th-century Genoese people
Dominican beatified people
Members of the Dominican Order
Italian Dominicans
Italian beatified people
Clergy from Genoa
Venerated Catholics